Jason Masi is an American folk/rock singer-songwriter and musician who plays guitar. He began his music career as the frontman of rock band Jubeus. They released a full-length album, Two Tone Circles, in 2004 and a second album, Natural Mood, in 2007. The band remained active until 2010, during a transitional moment for Jason's solo career.

Early life and Jubeus 
Jason was born and raised in Fredericksburg, Virginia. He excelled at soccer and played for Longwood University for two years before quitting to start a band.

He is most known for his work with Richmond-based band Jubeus and his solo endeavors. Jubeus played over 125 shows a year since forming in 2004 and recorded two albums. Their album Natural Mood, was played on over 200 college and triple A radio stations nationwide. It was also licensed for use on The Hills-MTV, Newport News-MTV. and other broadcasting stations and was named a top DIY Release by Performing Songwriter Magazine (Issue 107 – January/February 2008).

Although Jason is currently focused on his solo career, the band occasionally plays together.

Solo career 

Jason has performed at a number of popular music festivals including Camp Barefoot and Red Gorilla. He released three solo albums. In 2010, his first album, Balance & Pull, was included on George Graham's Top Albums of 2010 list. It also charted the Top 200 releases for college radio. His second full-length album, Life Is Wonderful that was released in 2012, had several notable placements. The song "That Summer," track no. 5, was included in the 2013 release Adobe Premiere Classroom textbook. The song "Dust & Bone" is featured on the popular learning site lynda.com in tutorials for DSLR tips. The programming company, Learning Gems, who designs learning Apps for kids, featured his song "The Situation" in the Learning Gems Puzzle App "Landscapes and Animals."

He appeared multiples times on CBS local talk and entertainment show "Virginia This Morning" as well as the PBS "Virginia Currents" and "The Music Seen" broadcast shows.

His latest album, Power of a Woman, was recently released in 2014.

Songwriting style and influences 
Jason has written over 100 songs since his beginnings. His song-writing style cultivates a variety of musical styles that include Caribbean, blues, soul, reggae, folk, pop, country, and jam.

His influences range from Bob Marley, to The Beatles, to Marvin Gaye to Red Hot Chili Peppers. His music sound and style have been compared to Gordon Lightfoot, Amos Lee, Incubus, Dispatch, Edwin McCain, Guster, and Van Morrison.

Personal life 

Jason currently resides in Alexandria, VA with his wife Jennifer. They married in the year 2010. They dated through the college years. She is currently the Pro Bono Director at the Children's Law Center.

Discography

Albums with Jubeus

Solo albums

See also 
Jubeus
Jason Masi Home
Pat McGee (musician)

References

External links 
 

Living people
Musicians from Richmond, Virginia
American rock musicians
1980 births